Psidium amplexicaule, which is commonly known as mountain guava, is a species in the family Myrtaceae that is native to the Caribbean. It is rare in a moist limestone forest at 100–600 feet altitude on north coast of Puerto Rico. This plant can also be found on islands such as St. Thomas and St. John in the United States Virgin Islands and in Tortola and Virgin Gorda of the British Virgin Islands.

Description
Mountain guava is a wild relative of guayaba, commonly known as guava (Psidium guajava). It can be distinguished by opposite and nearly round thick and leathery leaves  that are 1½ -2¾ inches in diameter. They are thick/leathery and almost stalkless. Smaller flowers are located at the ends or at the sides of the twigs that are about ½ inch across. Their round fruit is about ¾ inch in diameter, with calyx lobes at their apex. The mountain guava flower color is green and white and blooms in the spring and summertime. The plant is evergreen and can grow in height approximately 2.4 to 3.7 meters (8–12 ft) tall. It was denoted in 1976 as a small tree that is capable of growing to 20 feet tall.

References

External links
 

amplexicaule